Michael Gault (born 15 April 1983) is a Northern Irish football former player who is currently manager of Linfield F.C. Swifts. He previously managed Ballymacash Rangers from 2019-20.

Club career
Born in Lisburn, Gault began his senior career with Linfield in the 2001–02 season. He signed a professional three-and-a-half year contract in April 2003, signing extensions in May 2006, May 2009, and March 2012. During the 2012 extension Gault, who was club captain, lost his full-time professional status.

He was released by Linfield in May 2014, signing for Portadown later that month. He received a total of 21 yellow cards in 29 games in the 2015/16 season. In January 2016 it was announced he would leave the club in the summer after he signed a pre-contract agreement with Crusaders.

In July 2019, Michael Gault was appointed player manager of Mid-Ulster Football League club Ballymacash Rangers F.C.

Michael made 17 appearances playing for Ballymacash Rangers F.C. before retiring in August 2020 to focus on management.

Managerial career

Michael Gault took his first steps into management in July 2019 when he was appointed player manager of Ballymacash Rangers F.C.

Michael retired from playing in August 2020 and his sole responsibility at the club was then management. In his first season, which was brought to an early finish in March 2020 due to the COVID-19 pandemic, Michael led his side to a 2nd placed finish in the Mid-Ulster Football League Intermediate A division and a domestic cup final.

Michael stepped down from his role at The Bluebell to take up a role with Linfield F.C. as Manager of their Under 18 side. Gault is now manger of Linfield Swifts.

International career
Gault was called up to the Northern Ireland national team for the first time in October 2008. He made his international debut in a friendly match against Georgia in March 2008; Michael O'Connor also made his international debut in the same match.

Personal life
In 2003 Gault was studying computers at Ulster University; by 2006 he was studying sports science at their Jordanstown campus. Michael Gault is a qualified PE teacher and also a fully qualified Financial Advisor

Honours

Team
 Linfield
Irish League: 7
 2003–04, 2005–06, 2006–07, 2007–08, 2009–10, 2010–11, 2011–12
Irish Cup: 6
2005–06, 2006–07, 2007–08, 2009–10, 2010–11, 2011–12
Irish League Cup: 3
2001–02, 2005–06, 2007–08
County Antrim Shield: 5
2000–01, 2003–04, 2004–05, 2005–06, 2013–14
Setanta Cup: 1
2005

Individual
Irish League Player of the Month (2): March 2003, January 2006
Linfield Player of the Year (1): 2010–11
Northern Ireland Football Writers Player of the Year (1): 2007–08

References

1983 births
Living people
Association footballers from Northern Ireland
Northern Ireland international footballers
Linfield F.C. players
Portadown F.C. players
NIFL Premiership players
Association football midfielders
Crusaders F.C. players
Sportspeople from Lisburn
Schoolteachers from Northern Ireland
Ballymacash Rangers F.C. players
Ballymena United F.C. players
Annagh United F.C. players